Farini is a village in the municipality of Višnjan, Istria County, Croatia, 10 kilometres from the Western Croatian coast. In the 1991 census, Farini's population of 51 was demographically made up of 35% Croats, 25% Italians, 6% Hungarians and 33% other ethnicities. According to one source, Farini has occasional floods and earthquakes.

References 

Geography of Istria County